João Pessoa, a port city in northeastern Brazil, is the state of Paraíba's capital and largest city, with an estimated population of 817,511 (as of 2020). It is located on the right bank of the Paraíba do Norte river.

The new "Estação Ciência, Cultura e Artes" (Science, Culture and Art Station), located at the most eastern point of the Americas (Ponta do Seixas), is an educational and cultural institution as well as a national landmark. The complex, inaugurated in 2008, was created by Brazilian architect Oscar Niemeyer and is one of his final projects.

The capital of Paraíba received the title of Creative City by UNESCO in 2017, appointing João Pessoa as "Brazilian city of handicrafts".

History

The city of João Pessoa was founded on August 5, 1585, during the celebration of the peace pact between the Portuguese represented by the Portuguese João Tavares, and the indigenous people, represented by the Piragibe Indian, chief of the Tabajara , on the banks of the Paraíba River. The french inhabited the locality, and had an alliance with the indigenous tribe of potiguaras. With the alliance of the Portuguese with the Tabajaras (rivals of the Potiguaras), the Portuguese colonists, led by Frutuoso Barbosa, finally managed to expel the french and conquer Paraíba. After the conquest, they built the forts of São Tiago and São Felipe. They brought masons, carpenters, engineers and others to build the City of Nossa Senhora das Neves. With the beginning of the works, they went to Baía da Traição to expel the rest of the french who remained in Paraíba. There was the nomination of João Tavares to be the captain of the Fort. 

The Royal City of Nossa Senhora das Neves was the third city to be founded in Brazil, with the signing of an agreement between João Tavares and the chief Piragibe of the Tabajaras. Called "Royal City of Our Lady of the Snows", in honor of the saint of the day it was founded, its first structures were on the banks of the Sanhauá River, a tributary of the Paraíba River, now known as Porto do Varadouro, in the neighborhood of the same name. 

In 1588, the city was renamed "Philipeia of Our Lady of the Snows", in honor of King Philip II, who at the time accumulated the thrones of Spain and Portugal.

In 1634, attracted by the sugar wealth of the then-capital of the Paraíba, the Dutch invaded and named it Fredrikstad (Frederick City), in honor of the prince of Orange, Frederick of Orange, was one of the two main cities of New Holland, brought the town a period of great prosperity, the installation of mills on the coast enabled greater efficiency in sugar production, with the main consequence being the guarantee of large profits, but, on the other hand, it required the practice of monoculture that was developed in increasing extensions of land, the latifundia. After the decline of New Holland and with the departure of the Dutch, the city was again dominated by the Portuguese and acquired the name "Parahyba do Norte" in 1654.

The city was renamed João Pessoa in September 1930 in memory of the former governor of Paraíba, João Pessoa Cavalcanti de Albuquerque, who had been murdered on 26 July that year.

João Pessoa is the third oldest city in Brazil.

Geography

Environment

João Pessoa has  of beachfront.

This claim is a matter of conjecture, however, originating from a publicity stunt carried out by the city's mayor during an Earth Summit.

Hydrography
In João Pessoa, there are about twelve rivers. The Jaguaribe River is born in the Esplanada complex, crosses the Benjamim Maranhão Botanical Garden, in the middle of the Atlantic Forest, and flows into the Atlantic Ocean on the border with the municipality of Cabedelo. The water to supply the houses is taken from the Gramame-Mumbaba system, from the Paraíba Water and Sewerage Company. In this system, these two rivers take turns to supply the city with water. However, the most historically important river is the Sanhauá River, because it was on its banks that city was born and where the first houses were built.

There is also the Solón de Lucena Park Lagoon in the City Center. The lagoon was the main tourist spot in the city during the time when most of the city was far from the beaches. At the end of 2010, during the Christmas celebrations, the lagoon was revitalized and gained devices such as ambient music.

The capital of Paraíba has a coastline of about 24 kilometers in length, nine beaches in the municipality alone, in addition to the beaches of the Metropolitan Region, such as the city of Cabedelo, the city of Lucena and the District of Jacumã in the municipality of Conde , where the Tambaba Naturist Beach is located. Urban beaches are characterized by white sand beaches and crystal clear waters. Many have preserved the Atlantic Forest, as well as being ideal for bathing thanks to a natural barrier about 6 kilometers from the coast that protects a large part of the Pessoa and Cabedelo coast, allowing children to play in the calm waters. There is the Urban Tartarugas Project, which operates on the beaches of Bessa and Intermares, a spawning area for the hawksbill turtle, a scenario for environmental preservation. Surfing is also practiced in the city.

Among the main beaches, we can mention the Praia de Tambau, about 8 kilometers long, composed of fine, beaten sand, with blue-green waters; the bessa beach is where the caribessa is located, a quiet beach with crystalline waters; also the Praia de Manaíra, a totally urban beach, formed by coral reefs, which makes its waves weak and clear water in summer. It is the point of several kiosks and bars, with sports fields on its edge. The Cabo Branco beach, white sand and warm water; Playa Seixas, which is where the most eastern point of America is located. In addition to Praia da Penha, where the historic Chapel of Our Lady of Penha, built in 1763, where the penha pilgrimage takes place every year, from the historic center to the beach.; The Jacarape beach, where the Poet Ronaldo Cunha Lima Convention Center is located; then Praia do Sol, which is a quiet and airy place; and the barra de gramame beach, which situates the meeting of the river gramme with the sea.

Climate
João Pessoa has a tropical monsoon climate (Köppen Am) with very warm to hot temperatures all year long and strong rainfall in most of the months; however, October to December have rather low rainfall.

The city has a Benjamin Maranhão Botanical Garden, which preserves the Atlantic forest, the animals, and opens the visitation, which is the João Pessoa Botanical Garden, considered one of the largest remains of the natural Atlantic Forest in an urban area of Brazil.
It is a excellent opportunity for people to be in contact with pure and crystalline nature. Among these, environmental education is a relevant element, allowing interesting approaches, from knowledge and interest in plants to stimulating curiosity and knowledge of this important space for visitation and research. 

There are 18 stations distributed along the Rio and Preguiça trails using as criteria elements mainly related to history, botany and ecology, contributing to knowledge of the environment and the need for its preservation.The area has about 515ha, of which 343ha are home to the Botanical Garden, where the flora is not very soft in the recreational and educational activities promoted on the spot. It includes the largest natural urban Atlantic forest reserve in the country, and an important historical heritage of the capital of Paraiba.

Demographics
According to the Brazilian Institute of Geography and Statistics (Instituto Brasileiro de Geografia e Estatistica, or IBGE) report of 2009, João Pessoa had a population of 801,718. Its racial makeup was 45.72% White, 38.72% Pardo (two or more races), 2.77% Black, and 0.25% Asian or Amerindian.

Religion

Source: IBGE 2000.

Transportation

International airport
Joao Pessoa is served by Presidente Castro Pinto International Airport.

Rail system
The João Pessoa Urban Trains System is operated by diesel components on one railway line with a 30 km extension spanning four municipalities, João Pessoa, Cabedelo, Bayeux and Santa Rita, constituted by the Cabedelo stretch, with 10 stations in operation, carrying around 10,100 passengers a day. Composed of three locomotives and 17 passenger cars, the trains form two compositions that conduct 28 trips a day.

Economy
João Pessoa's Gross Domestic Product (GDP) was R$ 14,841,805 as of 2010.

The city's per capita income was R$ 19,284 as of 2010.

Tourism

 Natural Pools of Seixas Beach: The Seixas Natural Pools, where hundreds of species of fish, seaweed, reptiles (sea turtles), mollusks, crustaceans and other marine organisms are found.

 Penha Beach: This traditional beach's name derives from the symbol of one of the great religious events in Brazil: the Chapel of Our Lady of Penha. For more than 250 years, thousands of faithful have been accompanying the Penha Procession through the streets of João Pessoa.
 Manaira Beach: Joao Pessoa's most economically developed neighborhood. Its sidewalks are commonly used for physical activities and are well frequented by tourists and locals.
 Beach Tambaú: The sands of Praia de Tambaú are one of the busiest in Joao Pessoa.

 Seixas Beach: This beach is situated on the easternmost end of the Americas. Nationally known as the land area closest to the African continent, Praia do Seixas.
 Convention Center Poet Ronaldo Cunha Lima: The convention center of João Pessoa has four main buildings, the Lookout Tower, the Congress and Convention Hall, and the Pedra do Reino Theater.
 Espaço Cultural José Lins do Rego: Built through a project developed by architect Sérgio Bernardes, it includes the Archidy Picado Gallery, Lutheria, Planetarium, José Lins do Rêgo Museum, Anthenor Navarro Music School, Arena Theater, Paulo Pontes Theater.

Museums

Source:
 Museu Sacro e de Arte Popular, within the São Francisco church.
 Espaço Cultural José Lins do Rego. A cultural centre including history and science museums. 
 City Museum. The former Casa da Pólvora, an old gunpowder store. 
 Museu Fotográfico Walfredo Rodríguez.
 Bica Natural History Museum. Museum Foundation house of Jose Américo.
 Hotel Globo Museum: Formerly a luxury hotel in the city, it consists of two buildings of eclectic style, with its lines influenced by Neo-classical, Art Nouveau and Art Deco styles. Today it functions as a museum, where it houses the permanent exhibition of part of the Hotel's furniture in addition to a collection of popular art. It is frequently visited for its view of the Sanhauá River and the sunset seen from its garden.

Culture
The Historic Center of João Pessoa, recognized as National Institute of Historic and Artistic Heritage in December 2007, covers areas in the neighborhoods of the Center, Róger, Jaguaribe, Tambiá and Varadouro. There are listed 37 hectares in area and estimated around 700 buildings, in addition to streets, squares and historic parks that integrate this set, comprising most of the neighborhoods of Varadouro and the Center of the city. Its buildings make up a scenario of different styles and eras full of townhouses, squares, colonial houses and secular churches, being considered the main architectural collection of Paraíba, reporting the various phases of local history, and one of the largest and most important historical sites in Brazil.

The delimited area has assets that represent various periods in the history of João Pessoa, such as the baroque of the Igreja da Ordem Terceira de São Francisco; from the rococo of the Church and Convent of the Third Order of Our Lady of Carmo, Cathedral Basilica of Our Lady of the Snows, João Pessoa; of the Neoclassical architecture of the Church of Saint Peter Gonzalez, Church and Convent of Our Lady of the Rosary (João Pessoa), of the Baroque architecture of the São Francisco Cultural Center, Monastery of St. Benedict (João Pessoa), of the Mannerist style of the Church of Our Lady of Mercy (João Pessoa), all from the 17th century; of the colonial architecture and eclectic architecture of civil houses, in addition to Art Nouveau and Art Deco, from the 20s and 30s decades, predominant in square Antenor Navarro and in the former Hotel Globo, now transformed into a cultural center.

Sports

Stadiums
 José Américo de Almeida Filho Stadium
 Stadium of Grace

Football
The city is home to Auto Esporte, CSP and Botafogo.

American football
João Pessoa Espectros: This football team is regarded as the best football team in the northeastern region of Brazil, having earned a national title, seven regional titles and three state titles.

Kayaking
Bessa Beach offers kayaking, popular among tourists, to reach four beautiful kilometers (2.5 mi) of coral and marine life in the blue sea of the "Caribessa".

Surfing
The Paraíba nurtures great surfers, with athletes winning in many nationally prominent contests in the sport.

Diving
The coastline of João Pessoa includes the Alvarenga shipwreck, an artificial reef for developing marine life.

 Alvarenga Shipwreck : The Alvarenga was a vessel used to transport supplies to ships. It is possible for divers to penetrate the small bow and stern compartments safely. On the prow the winch to hoist the anchor remains in view. It is also common to find large stingrays and shoals of fish, such as the top cock and the hook.

Sister cities
  Hartford, Connecticut, United States.

  Pompano Beach, Florida, United States.

Notable people
 
 
Leo Oliveira (born 1980), Brazilian football player

Notes

References

External links

 
 Official Promotional video of João Pessoa | English

 
1585 establishments in the Portuguese Empire
Populated places established in 1585
Municipalities in Paraíba